Lars Lalin  (1729–1785), was a Swedish musician, playwright and opera singer. He was a hovsångare and a member of the Royal Swedish Academy of Music (1771). He was engaged at the Royal Swedish Opera in 1773–1783.

References 

 Lalin, Lars Samuel i Nordisk familjebok (andra upplagan, 1911)

1729 births
1785 deaths
18th-century Swedish male opera singers
Members of the Royal Swedish Academy of Music
18th-century Swedish writers